Vexillum atractoides is an extinct species of sea snail, a marine gastropod mollusk, in the family Costellariidae, the ribbed miters.

Description
The length of the shell attains 21 mm, its diameter 7 mm.

(Original description) The narrowly fusiform-biconic shell has a moderately elevated spire, ending in a blunt conoidal protoconch of four smooth whorls. The shell contains five whorls, excluding the protoconch. They are slightly convex, with a linear suture, sculptured with raised spiral threads and tessellated by curved transverse threads. The Body whorl shows a cancellate ornament, a little ventricose in front of suture, medially attenuated, but slightly dilated at the front. The aperture is very narrow. The outer lip is thin, smooth within, medially ecurved. The columella is nearly straight, with four plaits, the anterior one small.

Distribution
Fossils of this marine species were found in older Tertiary strata in Australia

References

External links
 

atractoides
Gastropods described in 1889
Gastropods of Australia